Josh Murphy (born 17 February 1995) is an Irish rugby union player for Pro14 and European Rugby Champions Cup side Leinster. He plays as a blindside flanker. He has a non-rugby playing twin brother, Max.

Leinster
Murphy was added to the Leinster Rugby academy ahead of the 2015–16 season, before earning promotion to the senior team at the end of his three years in the academy ahead of the 2018–19 season.

Murphy made his Leinster Rugby senior debut against Glasgow Warriors in November 2017, and marked his second appearance and first start against Dragons later that month with a try-scoring, man of the match performance.

He is currently a medical student at University College Dublin and will graduate in the Summer of 2021.

Connacht
On  31 January 2022 it was announced by Connacht Rugby that Murphy had signed a Two Year deal to join the Province, from Summer 2022.

Ireland
Murphy represented the Ireland Under-20s at both the 2014 and 2015 editions of the World Rugby Under 20 Championship, as well as featuring in 2015 Six Nations Under 20s Championship. He captained Ireland against the Wales Under-20s at the 2015 World Rugby Under 20 Championship, standing in for regular captain Nick McCarthy. He has described that moment as the proudest of his career so far.

References

External links
Leinster Profile
Pro14 Profile

1995 births
Living people
People educated at St Michael's College, Dublin
Rugby union players from County Wexford
Irish rugby union players
University College Dublin R.F.C. players
Leinster Rugby players
Rugby union number eights
Rugby union flankers
Connacht Rugby players
People from Enniscorthy
Alumni of University College Dublin
Irish twins
Twin sportspeople